Wil Hodgson (born 1978) is a non-binary English comedian. He has lived in Chippenham his whole life and began performing comedy in 2003. Prior to this he had worked part-time as a lecturer at Wiltshire College and had a stint training to be a wrestler during which he participated in 30-man "Battle Royals".

Hodgson is known for his fast and almost monotone delivery which along with his bizarre persona has been known to divide audiences. He is also known for his bright pink hair (until recently, a mohican) and his love of 1980s girl's toys such as Care Bears and My Little Pony.

Hodgson is also known for his material on women's bodies which he claims to be nature's greatest invention. He is vocal in his dislike of size zero models and airbrushed photos, expressing a preference for magazines such as Readers' Wives and for larger female celebrities such as Fern Britton and Liza Tarbuck.

Hodgson was a member of the Socialist Workers Party and the Anti Nazi League whilst a student at the University of Luton but claims to have no specific political allegiance besides his stance against racism, sexism and homophobia.

Hodgson's Edinburgh Festival shows have largely consisted of stand up material about his lifestyle and opinions combined with lengthy monologues about "The Red Team" a possibly fictional primary school sports day team made up of outcasts and misfits and their daily battles with the bullying "Green Team".

Hodgson's material tends towards autobiography rather than straight observation.

In 2004 he won a Perrier Award for Best Newcomer at the Edinburgh Festival Fringe.

He supported Ian Cognito on his national tour in 2005 and began his own national tour in January 2007. He supported Mark Thomas on some dates of his "It's The Stupid Economy Tour"

In December 2010, Hodgson filmed a cameo appearance in the independent feature film, What Happened After Macbeth directed by Jack Doyle which had been intended for release in 2013. The film also features cameos from stand-up comedians Seymour Mace and Des Sharples.

Personal life 
Hodgson is non-binary and uses they/them, he/him, and she/her pronouns.

DVDs
He has so far released three DVDs distributed by Go Faster Stripe.
 Skinheads, Readers' Wives and My Little Ponies
 Hatful of Hodgson
 Live on Bonfire Night

Edinburgh Festival Fringe
 2004 The Passion of the Hodgson (Perrier Best Newcomer Award)
 2005 Good Wil Hodgson
 2006 The Wil Hodgson Holiday Special
 2007 Straight Outta Chippenham
 2008 Chippenham on My Shoulder
 2009 Punk Folk Tales
 2010 Punkanory

References

External links

Wil Hodgson on WordPress

1978 births
Living people
Socialist Workers Party (UK) members
People from Bath, Somerset
People from Chippenham
21st-century English comedians
English comedians
Non-binary comedians